Purbrook Heath is a hamlet in the civil parish of Purbrook in the Havant district of Hampshire, England. Its nearest town is Waterlooville, which lies approximately 1.5 miles (2.6 km) north-east from hamlet. The Heath includes many attractions such as the cage where the locals can play football or basketball. There is also a cricket pitch, tennis courts and woodlands that has become popular for both dog walkers and the homeless.

Villages in Hampshire
Borough of Havant